Art Tenhouse (born December 27, 1950) was an American farmer, businessman, and politician.

Born in Quincy, Illinois, Tenhouse received his bachelor's degree in economics/agricultural science and his master's in finance accounting from University of Illinois He was one of the owners of "Four-Ten-Farms." From 1989 to 2006, Tenhouse served in the Illinois House of Representatives and was a Republican. In 2006, Tenhouse resigned from the Illinois General Assembly when he was named vice-president of the Illinois CPA Society which is based in Springfield, Illinois.

Notes

1950 births
Living people
People from Quincy, Illinois
University of Illinois alumni
Businesspeople from Illinois
Farmers from Illinois
Republican Party members of the Illinois House of Representatives